"Shotta Flow" is the breakout single by American rapper NLE Choppa, released as on January 17, 2019. A remix featuring American rapper Blueface was released on June 20, 2019 along with a music video directed by Cole Bennett. Produced by Midas800, The song reached number 36 on the US Billboard Hot 100 and was certified double platinum by the Recording Industry Association of America (RIAA). Three additional sequels to the song were released throughout 2019, with the fifth, "Shotta Flow 5", released in June 2020.
The original and the remix were later included on NLE Choppa's debut EP Cottonwood. "Shotta Flow 4", featuring Chief Keef, was released on NLE Choppa's debut album Top Shotta, on August 7, 2020. A sixth sequel, "Shotta Flow 6", is the opening track on NLE Choppa's Me vs. Me (mixtape),  released January 28, 2022.

Critical reception
Pitchfork named it their New Rap Song of the Day, complimenting it as a "true-to-Memphis shoot-dancing bounce" and NLE Choppa's "animated vocals" and "energetic delivery". Complex called it a "bouncy, menacing track". Billboard called "Shotta Flow" a "boisterous hip-hop track" with the rapper having a "melodic, heavy-hitting delivery". HotNewHipHop noted that the song "bec[ame ...] essentially inescapable on hip-hop playlists" and that the remix adds Blueface's "off-kilter flow" to the "piano-based production".

Music video 
An accompanying video at a length of three minutes was first released on YouTube in early January 2019, showcasing NLE Choppa and his friends "dancing, joking around and toting prop guns". The video quickly gained attention from hip hop vloggers and amassed 915,000 views within the first week of its release, according to YouTube. As of August 2020, the video has over 140 million views.

Reception 
According to Billboard magazine, within only a month after the "Shotta Flow" video went viral, NLE Choppa had sparked a bidding war among record companies like Republic, Interscope and Caroline, with bids reportedly reaching as high as $3 million. However, he turned down those offers to enter a distribution partnership with independent distribution company UnitedMasters.

Remix
A remix featuring American rapper Blueface was released on June 20, 2019, accompanied by a music video directed by Cole Bennett also known as Lyrical Lemonade. This music video has gained more than 299 million views as of April 2022, which is more than the original.

Charts

Weekly charts

Year-end charts

Certifications

References

2019 singles
2019 songs
NLE Choppa songs
Songs written by NLE Choppa

Blueface songs